José Tomás Reyes Vicuña (6 October 1914–6 January 1986) was a Chilean politician and architect who served as President of the Senate of Chile.

References

External links
 BCN Profile

1914 births
1986 deaths
People from Santiago
Chilean people of Spanish descent
Conservative Party (Chile) politicians
National Falange politicians
Christian Democratic Party (Chile) politicians
Deputies of the XLI Legislative Period of the National Congress of Chile
Deputies of the XLIII Legislative Period of the National Congress of Chile
Deputies of the XLIV Legislative Period of the National Congress of Chile
Presidents of the Senate of Chile
Senators of the XLV Legislative Period of the National Congress of Chile
Senators of the XLVI Legislative Period of the National Congress of Chile
Pontifical Catholic University of Chile alumni